The Best American Mystery Stories 2003, a volume in The Best American Mystery Stories series, was edited by Otto Penzler and by guest editor Michael Connelly.

Short Stories included

Other distinguished mystery stories of 2002

Other distinguished mystery stories of 2002 honored in the volume included Derek Alger's "Remembering the Rain" (The Literary Review), Dwight Allen's "End of the Steam Age" (Greensboro Review), Lawrence Block's "The Ehrengraf Reverse" (The Mighty Johns), C. M. Chan's "The Body in the Boot" (Alfred Hitchcock's Mystery Magazine), William Chretien's "The Worried Wife" (Futures), Robert Coover's "The Invisible Man" (Playboy), Bentley Dadmun's "Sisters" (Alfred Hitchcock's Mystery Magazine), Edmund X. Dejesus's "Troublemaker" (Alfred Hitchcock's Mystery Magazine), Justin Gustainis's "Bargain" (Futures), Colin Harrison's "Good Seats" (The Mighty Johns), Adrianne Harun's "Lost in the War of the Beautiful Lads" (The Sun), Joe Helgerson's "The Case of the Floating Pearl Diver" (Alfred Hitchcock's Mystery Magazine), Tabitha King's "The Women's Room" (Stranger: Dark Tales of Eerie Encounters), Linda Lavid's "The Accident" (Southern Cross Review), Dennis Lehane's "Gone Down to Corpus" (The Mighty Johns), Laird Long's "Sioux City Express" (HandHeldCrime), Mike Lupica's "No Thing" (The Mighty Johns), Robert Garner McBrearty's "Transformations" (The Green Hills Literary Lantern), Peter Nathaniel Malae's "Turning Point" (The Cimarron Review), Ray Nayler's "The Bat House" (Ellery Queen's Mystery Magazine), Carol O'Connell's "The Arcane Receiver" (The Mighty Johns), Kevin Stewart's "Red Dog" (Shenandoah), Marcia Talley's "Too Many Cooks" (Much Ado About Murder), Don Webb's "Our Novel" (The Magazine of Fantasy & Science Fiction), John Weisman's "A Day in the Country" (Playboy), Julie Weston's "Hunter Moon" (River Styx), and David Zeltserman's "More Than a Scam" (Mysterical Bizland).

References

2003 anthologies
Mystery anthologies
Mystery Stores 2003
Mariner Books books